John William Roberts (1898-1962) was a British businessman from Yorkshire, who was the founder of the JET brand of petrol.

Early life
He was born in Halifax. From the age of eleven he was working part-time in the mills. By the age of twelve he was working full-time. He came from a family of seven children.

He served in the First World War.

Career
Before the Second World War, he worked for Trent Oil Products, a chemical company in north Lincolnshire, and on Long Lane in Huddersfield.

JET
He started Jet Petroleum Ltd in October 1953. Its first company address was 23 John William Street in Huddersfield. His first tanker had the registration JET 855. In 1961 Jet was bought by Conoco for £12.5m.

Personal life
When he founded JET, he lived on Vicarage Gardens in Scunthorpe.

References

External links
 History

1898 births
1962 deaths
British businesspeople in the oil industry
British retail company founders
English company founders
Founders of the petroleum industry
People from Halifax, West Yorkshire
People from Scunthorpe
20th-century English businesspeople